Women's rhythmic group all-around competition at the 2008 Summer Olympics was held at the Beijing University of Technology Gymnasium.

Teams consist of six gymnasts, five of whom perform in each routine. There are two rounds, a preliminary and a final, with each round consisting of two routines. In the preliminary, each group completes one routine using five ropes and one routine using three hoops and two clubs. The eight teams with the highest combined scores in the two routines advance to the final. There, they perform the two routines again. Scores from the preliminary are ignored, and the groups are ranked according to their combined score in the two finals routines.

Qualification

Final

References

Links 
 Competition format
 Qualification results
 Final results

Gymnastics at the 2008 Summer Olympics
2008
2008 in women's gymnastics
Women's events at the 2008 Summer Olympics